M75 or M-75 may refer to:

Military
 M75 (APC), a United States armored personnel carrier
 M75 grenade launcher, a United States automatic grenade launcher
 M75 hand grenade, a Yugoslavian hand grenade
 M74/M75 mortar, a mortar developed in the former Yugoslavia
 M-75 rocket, locally made rockets used in Palestinian rocket attacks on Israel

Places
 Messier 75, a globular cluster in the constellation Sagittarius
 M-75 (Michigan highway), a Michigan state highway

Other uses
 Miles M.75 Aries, a Miles Gemini aircraft variant
 Siemens M75, a shock-proof, weatherproof phone
 SIG P220, a pistol also known as M75
 M 75, an age group for Masters athletics (athletes aged 35+)

See also

 
 
 
 Model 1875 (disambiguation) -- M-1875
 M1975 (disambiguation)
 75 (disambiguation)